Raundalen is a valley in Vestland county, Norway. The Bergen Line and County Road 307 (also known as also known as Raundalsvegen 'Raun Valley Road') run through the center of the valley, past the villages of Urdland, Skiple, Reimegrend, and Mjølfjell.

References

Valleys of Vestland
Voss
Ulvik